Piet Kroon (26 February 1945 - 2021) was a South African chess player, three-times South African Chess Championship winner (1965, 1969, 1975).

Biography
In the 1960s and 1970s Piet Kroon was one of South Africa's leading chess players. He participated many times in South African Chess Championship and three times won this tournament: in 1965, 1969 and 1975 (shared with Charles de Villiers).

Piet Kroon played for South Africa in the Chess Olympiads:
 In 1966, at second board in the 17th Chess Olympiad in Havana (+7, =2, -3),
 In 1968, at second board in the 18th Chess Olympiad in Lugano (+3, =4, -6),
 In 1974, at second board in the 21st Chess Olympiad in Nice (+2, =1, -3).

References

External links

1945 births
2021 deaths
Afrikaner people
Sportspeople from The Hague
South African chess players
Chess Olympiad competitors